Amrita Kumbher Sandhane (Quest for the Pitcher of Nectar) is a 1982 Bengali film directed by Dilip Roy. It is based on a story by "Kalkut", pseudonym of Samaresh Basu (1924–1988). Music is by Sudhin Dasgupta and stars Shubhendu Chatterjee, Aparna Sen, Bhanu Bandhopadhyay, Samit Bhanja, Ruma Guha Thakurta amongst others.

The film documents one of the largest Indian religious fairs, the Kumbh Mela, which is held at the confluence of the rivers Ganges, Yamuna and Saraswati. The action is seen through the eyes of Shubhendu Chatterjee who has come to the Mela not out of any religious sentiment but to see and understand people and seek the reason why “….multitudes upon multitudes of the old and weak and the young and frail enter without hesitation or complaint upon such incredible journeys and endure the resultant miseries without repining.” (Mark Twain after visiting the 1895 Mela)

Cast
 Subhendu Chatterjee
Aparna Sen
Bhanu Bandopadhyay
Samit Bhanja
Ruma Guha Thakurta
Mahua Roychoudhury
Anup Kumar
Sanghamitra Bandyopadhyay

Soundtrack
"Raam Jopo Raam Jopo" - Sujata Sarkar
"Allah Twala Tu Hi" - Shakti Thakur 
"Purob Jaiba Piyaba" - Ruma Guha Thakurta
"Ke Tumi Pagolpara He" - Amar Paul
"Amar Bodhu Geche" - Arunadhati Holme Chowdhury 
"Sadher Khancha Pore Robe" - Amar Paul

References

1982 films
Bengali-language Indian films
Kumbh Mela
1980s Bengali-language films
Films based on works by Samaresh Basu